Hobnail Peak is a triangular rock bluff immediately south of Mount Tricouni, on the east side of Skelton Glacier in Victoria Land, Antarctica. It was explored in 1957 by the New Zealand party of the Commonwealth Trans-Antarctic Expedition (1956–58), and named in association with Clinker Bluff and Mount Tricouni.

References

Mountains of the Ross Dependency
Hillary Coast